The Disney Songbook is Jim Brickman's fourteenth album. Brickman is joined by guest vocalists, including Wayne Brady, Kassie DePaiva, Kimberley Locke and Josh Gracin. Heather Phares of AllMusic writes that "The Disney Songbook may not be among Brickman's all-time best albums, but it's never less than relaxing and sweet."

Track listing

Track information and credits taken from the album's liner notes.

Personnel
 Producer: David Grow, Jim Brickman
 Executive Producer: Jay Landers
 Associate Producer: Damon Whiteside
 A&R Coordinator: Dani Markman
 Mastered by: Dave Collins
 Photography: Rocky Schenck
 Art Direction: Gabrielle Raumberger
 Design: Brandon Fall

References

External links
Jim Brickman Official Site
Disney Official Site

2005 albums
Jim Brickman albums
Walt Disney Records albums
Covers albums